There are over 20,000 Grade II* listed buildings in England. This list includes those in South Yorkshire.

Barnsley

|}

Doncaster

|}

Rotherham

|}

Sheffield

|}

Notes

External links

 
 
South Yorkshire
Lists of listed buildings in South Yorkshire